Ramón César Bóveda (born 18 March 1949 in Pirané, Argentina) is an Argentine former footballer who played as a winger. As a player, he participated in the 1975 Copa América with Argentina.

Honours
Rosario Central
 Primera División: 2
 1971 Nacional, 1973 Nacional

Atlético Nacional
 Campeonato Profesional: 1
  1976

References

External links
 Ramón Bóveda at BDFA.com.ar 

1949 births
Living people
Argentine footballers
Argentine expatriate footballers
Argentina international footballers
1975 Copa América players
Argentine Primera División players
Categoría Primera A players
Rosario Central footballers
Atlético Nacional footballers
Club Atlético Platense footballers
Club Atlético Sarmiento footballers
People from Formosa Province
Expatriate footballers in Colombia
Association football wingers